Urophora is a genus of tephritid  or fruit flies in the family Tephritidae.

Species

Urophora acompsa (Hendel, 1914)
Urophora aerea (Hering, 1942)
Urophora affinis (Frauenfeld, 1857)
Urophora agnata (Hering, 1942)
Urophora agromyzella Bezzi, 1924
Urophora algerica (Hering, 1941)
Urophora anthropovi Korneyev & White, 1992
Urophora aprica (Fallén, 1814)
Urophora bajae Steyskal, 1979
Urophora bakhtiari Namin & Nozari, 2015
Urophora bernhardi Korneyev & White, 1996
Urophora calcitrapae White & Korneyev, 1989
Urophora campestris Ito, 1983
Urophora cardui (Linnaeus, 1758)
Urophora caurina (Doane, 1899)
Urophora chaetostoma (Hering, 1941)
Urophora chakassica Shcherbakov, 2001
Urophora chejudoensis Kwon, 1985
Urophora chimborazonis Steyskal, 1979
Urophora christophi Loew, 1869
Urophora circumflava Korneyev, 1998
Urophora claripennis Foote, 1987
Urophora columbiana (Hering, 1942)
Urophora conferta (Walker, 1853)
Urophora congrua Loew, 1862
Urophora cordillerana Steyskal, 1979
Urophora coronata Basov, 1990
Urophora cubana Dirlbek & Dirlbeková, 1973
Urophora cuspidata (Meigen, 1826)
Urophora cuzconis Steyskal, 1979
Urophora dirlbeki Namin & Nozari, 2015
Urophora digna Richter, 1975
Urophora disjuncta Becker, 1919
Urophora doganlari Kütük, 2006
Urophora dzieduszyckii Frauenfeld, 1867
Urophora egestata (Hering, 1953)
Urophora euryparia Steyskal, 1979
Urophora eved Steyskal, 1979
Urophora formosa (Coquillett, 1894)
Urophora formosana (Shiraki, 1933)
Urophora funebris (Hering, 1941)
Urophora grindeliae (Coquillett, 1908)
Urophora hermonis Freidberg, 1974
Urophora hispanica Strobl, 1905
Urophora hodgesi Steyskal, 1979
Urophora hoenei (Hering, 1936)
Urophora iani Korneyev & Merz, 1998
Urophora impicta (Hering, 1942)
Urophora ivannikovi Korneyev & White, 1996
Urophora jaceana (Hering, 1935)
Urophora jaculata Rondani, 1870
Urophora jamaicensis Steyskal, 1979
Urophora japonica (Shiraki, 1933)
Urophora kasachstanica (Richter, 1964)
Urophora korneyevi White, 1999
Urophora longicauda (Hendel, 1927)
Urophora lopholomae White & Korneyev, 1989
Urophora mamarae (Hendel, 1914)
Urophora mandschurica (Hering, 1940)
Urophora mauritanica Macquart, 1851
Urophora melanops Steyskal, 1979
Urophora mexicana Steyskal, 1979
Urophora misakiana (Matsumura, 1916)
Urophora mora (Hering, 1941)
Urophora neuenschwanderi Freidberg, 1982
Urophora nigricornis Hendel, 1910
Urophora paulensis Steyskal, 1979
Urophora pauperata (Zaitzev, 1945)
Urophora phalolepidis Merz & White, 1991
Urophora pontica (Hering, 1937)
Urophora quadrifasciata (Meigen, 1826)
Urophora regis Steyskal, 1979
Urophora repeteki (Munro, 1934)
Urophora rufipes (Curran, 1932)
Urophora sachalinensis (Shiraki, 1933)
Urophora sciadocousiniae Korneyev & White, 1992
Urophora setosa Foote, 1987
Urophora simplex Becker, 1919
Urophora sinica Zia, 1938
Urophora sirunaseva (Hering, 1938)
Urophora sjumorum (Rohdendorf, 1937)
Urophora solaris Korneyev, 1984
Urophora solstitialis (Linnaeus, 1758)
Urophora spatiosa (Becker, 1913)
Urophora spoliata (Haliday, 1838)
Urophora stalker Korneyev, 1984
Urophora stenoparia Steyskal, 1979
Urophora stigma (Loew, 1840)
Urophora stylata (Fabricius, 1775)
Urophora syriaca (Hendel, 1927)
Urophora tengritavica Korneyev & Merz, 1998
Urophora tenuior Hendel, 1910
Urophora tenuis Becker, 1908
Urophora terebrans (Loew, 1850)
Urophora timberlakei Blanc & Foote, 1961
Urophora townsendi Bezzi, 1923
Urophora tresmilia Steyskal, 1979
Urophora trinervii Korneyev & White, 1996
Urophora trivirgulata Foote, 1960
Urophora tsoii Korneyev & White, 1993
Urophora unica Becker, 1919
Urophora variabilis Loew, 1869
Urophora vera Korneyev & White, 1996
Urophora volkovae Korneyev, 1985
Urophora xanthippe (Munro, 1934)

References

 
Tephritinae
Tephritidae genera
Taxa named by Jean-Baptiste Robineau-Desvoidy
Diptera of Europe
Diptera of Asia
Diptera of Africa
Diptera of South America
Diptera of North America